The 1999 Adidas Open de Toulouse was a men's tennis tournament played on indoor hard courts in Toulouse, France that was part of the World Series of the 1999 ATP Tour. It was the eighteenth edition of the tournament and was held from 27 September until 3 October 1999. Unseeded Nicolas Escudé won the singles title.

Finals

Singles

 Nicolas Escudé defeated  Daniel Vacek, 7–5, 6–1

Doubles

 Olivier Delaître /  Jeff Tarango defeated  David Adams /  John-Laffnie de Jager, 3–6, 7–6, 6–4

References

External links
 ITF tournament edition details

Grand Prix de Tennis de Toulouse
Grand Prix de Tennis de Toulouse
Grand Prix de Tennis de Toulouse
Grand Prix de Tennis de Toulouse
Grand Prix de Tennis de Toulouse